Foreign relations exist between Austria and Vietnam. Austria has an embassy in Hanoi. Vietnam has an embassy in Vienna. Diplomatic relations were established in 1972.

High level visits
Austrian President Heinz Fischer visited Vietnam in May 2012.

Trade
Bilateral trade has experienced significant growth over recent years. It reached US$630 million in 2011, a year on year increase of 240 per cent, and $171 million in the first quarter of 2012.

See also 
 Foreign relations of Austria
 Foreign relations of Vietnam
 Vietnam–European Union relations

References

External links 
Vietnamese embassy in Vienna

 
 
Vietnam
Bilateral relations of Vietnam